Eszter Rasztótsky is a Hungarian sprint canoer who has competed in the early 2000s. She won a gold medal in the K-4 1000 m event at the 2003 ICF Canoe Sprint World Championships in Gainesville.

References

Hungarian female canoeists
Living people
Year of birth missing (living people)
ICF Canoe Sprint World Championships medalists in kayak